Murray S. Greenfield is an American-born Israeli writer and publisher.

History 
In Israel, Greenfield began working in Haifa, seeking foreign investors to deposit capital in the Palestinian Economic Cooperation. In the early days of Israel’s existence, most philanthropists only thought of donating charity to poverty-stricken immigrants.

Greenfield later settled in Tel Aviv with his bride, Hana Lustigova. He was one of the founding members of the Association of Americans and Canadians in Israel (AACI), wherein he later served as executive director. Under his directorship, the AACI flourished; Greenfield pioneered and established loan funds, a mortgage company, and a variety of housing projects in Jerusalem, Tel Aviv, and kibbutzim.

Greenfield was always involved in public service, but the cause to which he dedicated the most time was rescuing Ethiopian Jewry; he was volunteer director for seven years of the American Association for Ethiopian Jewry (AAEJ).

In 1981, Greenfield founded Gefen Publishing House, later taken over by his sons, Dror and Ilan. After Dror’s passing in 2003, Ilan continued to run the company. Today, Gefen publishes up to 35 titles a year and is the main English language publisher in Israel.

Family 
Hana and Murray Greenfield had three children, Meira, Dror, and Ilan; and ten grandchildren, all of whom live in Israel. Dror Greenfield died in 2003, Hana Greenfield passed away in January 2014.

Books 
In 2010 his best-known book, which he spent more than a decade researching, The Jews' Secret Fleet, was published, about the participation of North American sailors in Aliyah Bet. He was himself was just such a volunteer participant. The then-illegal vessels brought more than half of the Holocaust survivors from displaced persons camps to Palestine, over which the British gave up the British Mandate of Palestine, after which the United Nations voted to establish Israel.

In 1973, Greenfield published a book along with his wife titled How to be an Oleh, or Things the Jewish Agency Never Told You. He founded and contributed editorially to Israel's first-ever English language magazine, FrontPage, and later a monthly titled Rossvet, aimed at Russian immigrants. Hana, a Holocaust survivor, wrote Fragments of Memory, which has been published in six languages. Together they founded the Czech Torah Network.

Films 

In 2008 a documentary film directed by Alan Rosenthal was released titled Waves of Freedom, which features Murray Greenfield. Rosenthal was inspired to create the documentary after reading Greenfield's book The Jews’ Secret Fleet, which features an introduction by Sir Martin Gilbert. The Jews’ Secret Fleet has achieved great success, and a new edition was published in 2010.

References 

Living people
Year of birth missing (living people)
Jewish American writers
Israeli Jews
Israeli non-fiction writers
21st-century American Jews